The women's 100 metres event at the 1999 All-Africa Games was held 14–15 September 1999 at the Johannesburg Stadium.

Medalists

Results

Heats
Qualification: First 2 of each heat (Q) and the next 6 fastest (q) qualified for the semifinals.

Semifinals
Qualification: First 4 of each semifinal (Q) qualified for the final.

Final
Wind: +0.1 m/s

References

100
1999